The New Zealand Mixed Curling Championship is the national championship of mixed curling (two men and two women) in New Zealand. It has been held annually since 2010 and organized by New Zealand Curling Association.

In mixed curling, the positions on a team must alternate between men and women. If a man throws last rocks, which is usually the case, the women must throw lead rocks and third rocks, while the other male member of the team throws second rocks.

List of champions and medallists
The past champions and medalists of the event are listed as follows (in order – fourth/skip, third, second, lead, alternate; skips marked bold):

See also
New Zealand Men's Curling Championship
New Zealand Women's Curling Championship
New Zealand Mixed Doubles Curling Championship

References

Curling competitions in New Zealand
Recurring sporting events established in 2010
2010 establishments in New Zealand
National curling championships
Mixed curling
Sport in Auckland